Jonas Berglund (born December 4, 1990) is a Swedish professional ice hockey player. He currently plays for Luleå HF in the Swedish Swedish Hockey League (SHL).

During the 2018–19 season, on 1 January 2018, Larsson extended his contract for an additional year with Luleå HF through to 2020.

References

External links

1990 births
Almtuna IS players
Asplöven HC players
Frisk Asker Ishockey players
Luleå HF players
Living people
Manglerud Star Ishockey players
Swedish ice hockey forwards
Swedish expatriate ice hockey people
Swedish expatriate sportspeople in Norway